Jazán is a district of Bongará Province, Peru.

References

Districts of the Bongará Province
Districts of the Amazonas Region